Melton South Football and Netball Club, nicknamed the Panthers, is an Australian rules football and netball club located in Melton. The football squad competes in the Ballarat Football League which is part of the Victorian Country Football League.
They have cross town rivals in the Melton Football Club.

History
The club was formed in 1973 and commenced in the Riddell District Football League. 
The Bacchus March FL and the Ballarat & District FL had merged but the club with its cross town rival Melton opted to join the Riddell District Football League.

In 1997, the stronger clubs ( Darley, Melton, Melton South,& Sunbury) of the Riddell District Football League were transferred to the Ballarat Football League.

There have been a few great footballers to go through the club including, Sean Denham, Ben Haynes and Paul Chambers.

Premierships
 Riddell District Football League (1): 1994

Bibliography
History of Football in the Ballarat District by John Stoward -

References

External links
Facebook page

Melton South
1973 establishments in Australia
Netball teams in Victoria (Australia)
Australian rules football clubs in Victoria (Australia)
Riddell District Football League clubs
Sport in the City of Melton